Charl McLeod (born 5 August 1983) is a rugby union player for Grenoble in the French Top 14.

On 18 November 2010, whilst the Springboks were already two matches into their November tour of Ireland, Wales, Scotland and England, Charl received the call to join the squad.

References

External links
Sharks profile

itsrugby.co.uk Profile

1983 births
Living people
South African rugby union players
South Africa international rugby union players
Sharks (rugby union) players
Sharks (Currie Cup) players
Golden Lions players
Falcons (rugby union) players
Rugby union scrum-halves
Rugby union players from Johannesburg
White South African people
South African people of Scottish descent
South African expatriate rugby union players
South African expatriate sportspeople in France
Expatriate rugby union players in France
FC Grenoble players